Halle OWL-Arena is a railway station located in Halle, Germany. The station is on the Osnabrück–Brackwede railway. The train services are operated by NordWestBahn. The station lies approx. 500m from the OWL Arena, a stadium for sports and concerts.

Train services 
The following services currently call at Halle OWL-Arena:

References

Railway stations in North Rhine-Westphalia
Halle (Westfalen)
Buildings and structures in Gütersloh (district)
Railway stations in Germany opened in 1997